The Csardas Princess is a 1934 German operetta film directed by Georg Jacoby and starring Mártha Eggerth, Hans Söhnker and Paul Kemp. It is based on the 1915 operetta Die Csárdásfürstin composed by Emmerich Kálmán.

The film's sets were designed by the art directors Robert Herlth and Walter Röhrig. A separate French-language version Princesse Czardas was also produced.

In 1951 Jacoby remade the film starring his wife Marika Rökk.

Cast
Mártha Eggerth as Sylva Varescu
Hans Söhnker as Prinz Edwin Weylersheim
Paul Kemp as Graf Bonipart Kancsianu
Inge List as Countess Stasi von Planitz
Paul Hörbiger as Feri von Kerekes
Hans Junkermann as Der Kommandeur
Friedrich Ulmer as Fürst Weylersheim
Ida Wüst as Fürstin Weylersheim
Edwin Jürgensen as Der Manager
Andor Heltai as Der Zigeunerprimas
Ilse Fürstenberg as Mädi vom Chantant
Marina von Ditmar as Mädi vom Chantant
Charlott Daudert as Mädi vom Chantant
Karin Luesebrink as Mädi vom Chantant
Margot Höpfner as Mädi vom Chantant
Hedi Höpfner as Mädi vom Chantant
Liselotte Hessler as Mädi vom Chantant
Olga Engl as Die Ankleiderin

References

External links

Operetta films
1934 musical films
German musical films
Films of Nazi Germany
1930s German-language films
Films directed by Georg Jacoby
UFA GmbH films
German multilingual films
Films based on operettas
German black-and-white films
1934 multilingual films
1930s German films